Cornelius Elementary School can refer to:
Cornelius Elementary School (Texas)
Cornelius Elementary School - Cornelius, North Carolina - Charlotte-Mecklenburg Schools